Maksim Unt (also Maxim Unt and Maximilian Unt; 20 January 1898 in Pärnu, Estonia, then Russian Empire – 31 July 1941 in Moscow, Russia, then USSR) was an Estonian and Soviet politician.

Biography

During the Russian Civil War, Unt worked to establish bolshevik rule in Ukraine and Saratov. After being accused of looting and sentenced to death in absentia, he fled to the area occupied by the White Army under Anton Denikin, before returning to the newly independent Republic of Estonia in 1920. 

Unt joined the Estonian Social Democratic Workers' Party, aligning himself with the party's left wing. He was a member of parliament (IV Riigikogu) from 6 May 1931, replacing Eduard Kink. On 9 May 1931, he resigned and was replaced by Villem Tammai. He was also elected a member of the V Riigikogu (1932–1934) and Riigivolikogu (Chamber of Deputies) of the VI Riigikogu (1938–1940).

Prior to the Soviet occupation of the Baltic states (1940), Unt was appointed by Andrei Zhdanov, the Soviet emissary to Estonia, to organize pro-Stalinist demonstrations and strikes across the country, calling for the resignation of Prime Minister Jüri Uluots. After the Soviet occupation, Unt was appointed as Minister of the Interior in Johannes Vares' cabinet on 21 June 1940. After Vares' cabinet was replaced by the Council of People's Commissars of the Estonian SSR on 25 August 1940, he remained as People's Commissar of Labour.

In May 1941, Unt's defection to the White Army during the Civil War was discovered. He was arrested on 22 May 1941 by Soviet authorities and dismissed from his position as People's Commissar of Labour on 28 May. He was sentenced to 8 years of forced labor by the Supreme Court of the USSR on 8 July, but was instead executed by gunshot by the NKVD at Kommunarka shooting ground in Moscow on 31 July. 

Unt was rehabilitated by the USSR Prosecutor's Office on 3 December 1991.

References

1898 births
1941 deaths
People from Pärnu
Soviet politicians
Estonian Social Democratic Workers' Party politicians
Communist Party of Estonia politicians
Ministers of the Interior of Estonia
People's commissars and ministers of the Estonian Soviet Socialist Republic
Members of the Riigikogu, 1929–1932
Members of the Riigikogu, 1932–1934
Members of the Riigivolikogu
Members of the Supreme Soviet of the Estonian Soviet Socialist Republic, 1940–1947
Soviet military personnel of the Russian Civil War
Estonian people executed by the Soviet Union
People executed by the Soviet Union by firearm
Soviet rehabilitations